The Brigand is a 1952 American adventure romance film directed by Phil Karlson and starring Anthony Dexter, Jody Lawrance and Anthony Quinn.  It is the second film that Anthony Dexter made for producer Edward Small for Columbia Pictures after his debut in Valentino.

Plot
A rogue exile impersonates a King and a virtuous person wants to be so because he is the rightful heir to the throne.

Loosely based on The Brigand by Alexandre Dumas, the film is set in the Napoleonic era in 1804 in the mythical Iberian nation of "Mandorra".  The film bears a resemblance to The Prisoner of Zenda with Dexter playing a dual role of a rogue exile who impersonates a King in danger of being overthrown by his cousin played by Anthony Quinn.

The scheming Quinn plans a "premeditated accident" to King Lorenzo by giving him a hunting weapon that is rigged to fire backwards; an idea reused by director Phil Karlson in his The Silencers.  With the real King unable to perform his duties, the swashbuckling distant relative Carlos DeLago, late of the Sultan of Morocco's Guard steps in to save the Kingdom.

Cast
Anthony Dexter as Captain Carlos Delargo/King Lorenzo of Mandorra
Jody Lawrance as Princess Teresa
Gale Robbins as Countess Flora
Anthony Quinn as Prince Ramon
Carl Benton Reid as Prime Minister Triano 
Ian MacDonald as Maj. Schrock 
Lester Matthews as Dr. Lopez 
Walter Kingsford as Sultan of Morocco 
Holmes Herbert as Archbishop 
George Melford as Majordomo (uncredited)

Production
There is no producer credit on the film but the movie was produced by Edward Small just before he left Columbia to return to United Artists.

In May 1949 it was reported that Small had hired Robert Libott and Frank Burt to write the script in 1949. In December 1949 Small signed a two-year contract with Columbia to make "two to six" films, which would include Lorna Doone and The Brigand, "projects he had been developing for some time." This contract was separate to one Small had signed with Columbia to distribute Valentino.

In August 1950 Small announced that he would make two films starring Anthony Dexter, who had made Valentino for the producer. The films would be The Brigand and a remake of The Sheik. In May 1951 Jesse Lasky Jr was reportedly writing the script. The same month Phil Karlson was announced as director.

Ron Randell had appeared in Lorna Doone for Small. In August 1951 he signed to appear in The Brigand; he was to do it at the same time as appearing in Broadway Bill at the Pasadena Playhouse.

Filming started 9 July 1951.

Reception
The New York Times called it "no great shakes. But neither, as a standard sample of this type of entertainment, is it hard to take." Variety called it "a program swashbuckler". The Los Angeles Times said "serious characterisation gives way to dash and colour."

References

External links

1952 films
1950s English-language films
1952 adventure films
1950s historical films
American historical films
Romantic period films
Columbia Pictures films
Films set in the 1800s
Films set in Europe
Films set in a fictional country
Films directed by Phil Karlson
Films adapted into comics
Films produced by Edward Small
Films scored by Mario Castelnuovo-Tedesco
American adventure films
1950s American films